Clifford Williams (20 April 1898 – 28 May 1930) was a Welsh international rugby union hooker who played club rugby most notably for Llanelli and Cardiff. Williams played two matches for Wales, against New Zealand in 1924 and England in 1925.

Personal history
Williams was born in Llangennech in 1898, becoming a collier on leaving school. He served in the Royal Navy during the First World War, and on return to civilian duties he joined the Glamorgan Constabulary. He died at the age of 32, shortly after his marriage.

Rugby career
Williams first played rugby as a schoolboy, representing Llangennech School, before progressing to the Llangennech club. He switched to first-class side Llanelli, and while at the club he was first selected for the Wales national side in a game against the 1924 touring New Zealanders. Initially the Aberavon forward, Bob Randall, had been the preferred choice as hooker, but withdrew with a knee injury, allowing Williams to take his place. The match was a one-sided affair with Wales outclassed in speed and combination, but the Welsh forwards worked tirelessly against a much heavier pack. The game ended 19-0 to New Zealand.

Just three days later, on 2 December, Williams faced the New Zealand 'All Blacks' again, this time as part of his club team Llanelli. Williams, along with Albert Jenkins and Ernie Finch, who were also part of the Wales team that faced New Zealand, inspired the team in a close encounter. It was only some poor Llanelli kicking that cost the club team a victory over an exceptional touring side.

Williams won his second and final cap in the England encounter of the 1925 Five Nations Championship. The next season, Williams switched club to Cardiff, spending two years and making 39 appearances for the 'Blue and Blacks'. His time with the Royal Navy and Glamorgan Constabulary, saw him represent the rugby teams of both.

Bibliography

References

1898 births
1930 deaths
Bargoed RFC players
Cardiff RFC players
Glamorgan Police RFC players
Llanelli RFC players
Llangennech RFC players
Royal Navy personnel of World War I
Rugby union hookers
Rugby union players from Carmarthenshire
Wales international rugby union players
Welsh police officers
Welsh rugby union players
Glamorgan Police officers